Pyrgomantis mabuia is a species of praying mantis found in Uganda.

See also
List of mantis genera and species

References

Pyrgomantis
Mantodea of Africa
Insects described in 1907